The following is a list of films originally produced and/or distributed theatrically by Metro-Goldwyn-Mayer and released between 1970 and 1979.

See also 
 Lists of Metro-Goldwyn-Mayer films

References 

1970-1979
American films by studio
1970s in American cinema
Lists of 1970s films